Ghostin may refer to:

 "Ghostin'", a song from the album The One and Only by Lil Wyte
 "Ghostin" (Ariana Grande song), a song from the album thank u, next by Ariana Grande
 Ghostin Lar, a village in Qazvin Province, Iran
 Ghost-riding, an activity similar to car surfing